AKK may refer to:
Akk tribe, an ancient South Arabian tribe
AKK-Motorsport, a Finnish motorsport organisation 
Alaskan Klee Kai, a northern breed of dog in the spitz family
Alpha Kappa Kappa, US medical school fraternity
Annegret Kramp-Karrenbauer (born 1962), German politician
Akhiok Airport's IATA airport code
Akkadian language's ISO 639-3 code